Yawar Rural LLG is a local-level government (LLG) of Madang Province, Papua New Guinea.

The Lower Ramu languages (Ottilien–Misegian) are all spoken in this LLG.

Wards
01. Marangis (Marangis language speakers)
02. Kaiyan (Kaian language speakers)
03. Boroi (Mbore language speakers)
04. Buliva
05. Daiden
06. Dongan (Bosmun language speakers)
07. Awar (Awar language speakers)
08. Nubia
09. Birap
10. Rugusak
11. Ambu
13. Sepa (Sepen language speakers)
14. Rugasak
15. Banag
16. Giri Tung (Giri language speakers)
17. Damangap
18. Kumnung
19. Minung
20. Kuarak
21. Mikarew (Mikarew language speakers)
22. Abegini
23. Dinam Adui
24. Apengan
25. Ariangon
26. Amba Arep
27. Aringen Gun
28. Dimuk Sirin
29. Giar Wazamb
30. Andeamarup
31. Duapmung
32. Andarum
33. Ingamuk
34. Barit
35. Kayoma
36. Bang Wokam (Gorovu language speakers)
37. Sanai Taringi
38. Naupi
39. Gwaia Akurai
80. Bogia Urban

References

Local-level governments of Madang Province